James Hall Gordon Hickie (born 14 September 1948) is a Scottish cinematographer.

Filmography
2007 – Holby City
2010 – Waterloo Road (Episodes 5.14, 5.17 and 5.18)
2006 – The Inspector Lynley Mysteries
2002 – Silent Witness
2004 – Hustle
2004 – Red Cap
2002 – Being April
2002 – Helen West
2000 – The Ghost of Greville Lodge
2000 – Attachments
2000 – Between Two Women
1999 – Cafe D'Paris (short)
1998 – Space Island One
1998 – The Big Swap
1998 – Driven
1997 – Red Mercury
1995 – Clockwork Mice
1994 – A Night with a Woman, a Day with Charlie (TV Short)
1992 – Leon the Pig Farmer

References

1948 births
Scottish cinematographers
Living people
Place of birth missing (living people)